Blue Lake Rancheria Transit System is a tribal run, one route, transit system in Humboldt County, CA. It provides service weekday only between the Arcata Transit Center and the Blue Lake Rancheria.

Fares 
One way fares as of 2020 are $1.65 for adults, $0.75 for youth 7–12 years old, and $0.25 for children 4–6 years old. Blue Lake also offers 10 and 20 ride passes that provide a 10% and 32% discount respectively.

References

Blue Lake, California